Senator Figures may refer to:

Michael A. Figures (1947–1996), Alabama State Senate
Vivian Davis Figures (born 1957), Alabama State Senate